The 2019 Louisville Cardinals women's soccer team represented University of Louisville during the 2019 NCAA Division I women's soccer season.  The Cardinals were led by head coach Karen Ferguson-Dayes, in her twentieth season.  They played home games at Lynn Stadium.  This was the team's 35th season playing organized women's college soccer and their 6th playing in the Atlantic Coast Conference.

The Cardinals finished the season 13–5–2, 5–3–2 in ACC play to finish in fourth place.  As the fourth seed in the ACC Tournament, they lost to NC State in the Quarterfinals.  They received an at-large bid to the NCAA Tournament where they defeated Lipscomb before losing to BYU in the Second Round.

Squad

Roster

Updated June 30, 2020

Team management

Source:

Schedule

Source:

|-
!colspan=6 style=""| Exhibition

|-
!colspan=6 style=""| Non-Conference Regular Season

|-
!colspan=6 style=""| ACC Regular Season

|-
!colspan=7 style=""| ACC Tournament

|-
!colspan=7 style=""| NCAA Tournament

Rankings

References

Louisville
Louisville Cardinals women's soccer seasons
2019 in sports in Kentucky